Gin no Tsuki, Kuroi Hoshi (銀の月 黒い星) is the second maxi single by Japanese band Alice Nine on March 30, 2005. The single was released with a DVD containing the music video for "Gin no Tsuki, Kuroi Hoshi."  The title translates to "Silver moon, black star."

Both songs on the single were later released on Alice Nine's third EP, Kasou Musou Shi.

Track listing
 "Gin no Tsuki, Kuroi Hoshi" (銀の月 黒い星; Silver Moon, Black Star) – 4:38
 "Kousai Stripe" (光彩ストライプ; Stripe of Brilliance) – 4:53

DVD
 "Gin no Tsuki, Kuroi Hoshi" (銀の月 黒い星; Silver Moon, Black Star)

2005 singles
Alice Nine songs
2005 songs
King Records (Japan) singles
Song articles with missing songwriters